Safaa Fathy is an Egyptian poet, documentary filmmaker, playwright, and essayist. She is best known for her film Derrida's Elsewhere, a documentary which focuses on the life and concepts of controversial philosopher Jacques Derrida.

Early life and career
Fathy was born in Minya, Upper Egypt on July 17, 1958. She studied English literature in Cairo. Fathy participated in the student movement while in Egypt but later left the country and settled in Paris in 1981. In 1987, she was an assistant director at the Deutsches Theater located in East Berlin. Fathy worked with Heiner Muller in 1990. She completed her doctoral thesis at the Sorbonne in 1993; her thesis was on Bertolt Brecht. Before becoming a filmmaker, Fathy worked as a stage director.

Currently she serves as director of programme at the International College of Philosophy in Paris.

Selected works

Poetry

Collections
Revolution goes through walls, collection in Arabic, also published in English and French translations
A name to the sea
Al Haschiche (a book of poetry accompanied by film-poem, Hidden Valley) bilingual Spanish-French, Ediciones sin nombre, Mexico
…où ne pas naître, bilingual collection in Arabic and French
Little Wooden Dolls

In collective volumes 
Ma langue est mon territoire, Collection Folies d’encre, Eden, Paris
Anthology of Contemporary Arab Women Poets

Theatre
Ordalie ; Terreur (2004)

Books 
Tourner les mots with Jacques Derrida

Essays and other writings

On philosophy and politics 
L’aporie of lui   in Derrida à Coimbra. Palimage Editores, Coimbra, Portugal. 2006
Un(e) spectre nommé(e) « avenir » in Cahiers de l’Herne on Jacques Derrida. 2005
Derrida, metteur en scène ou acteur Magazine Littéraire, N° 430. 2004
Transparence du Halal, transgression du Haram Vacarme, 2002

On poetry, theatre, cinema 
hôra/Luz y desierto. Revelación de lo oscuro (Spanish, 2010)
Hisser les voiles: Odyssée féminine à travers la Méditerranée. Microfisuras, 1999*
Dissidences et dissonances. Cartographie d'une poésie égyptienne. Almadraba (revue), Seville. 1998
Exil, in Pour Rushdie, La Découverte, Paris. 1993

Selected filmography

Documentary 
Mohammad sauvé des eaux (Mohammad Saved from the Waters), TS production, Paris
Dardasha Socotra, UNESCO, government of Yemen.
D'ailleurs, Derrida, Arte, France
Maxime Rodinson : l'Athée des Dieux (Maxime Rodinson, Atheist of the Gods), France
Ghazeia, danseuses d'Egypte (Ghazeia, Egyptian Dancers), Canal plus, France
Hidden Faces

Fiction 
Nom à la mer, film-poem, text Safaa Fathy, read by Jacques Derrida 
Silence, short fiction, Mention spéciale du Jury, Rencontres de Digne-les-Bains 1997, prime à la qualité CNC
Doisneau

References

External links 

Safaa Fathy at Allocine. (French)
Review of Derrida's Elsewhere, Reginald Lilly, The French Review, Vol. 77, No. 2 (Dec., 2003)

1958 births
Living people
Egyptian women poets
Egyptian women film directors
20th-century Egyptian poets
20th-century Egyptian women writers
21st-century Egyptian poets
21st-century Egyptian women writers